Namkungia is a genus of cave-dwelling insects in the family Grylloblattidae found in Korea. It contains 2 species, both of which are found in caves in Jeongseon County, Gangwon Province, South Korea.

Species
These species belong to the genus Namkungia:

Namkungia biryongensis (Namkung 1974) – type locality: Biryong Cave, Jeongseon County, Gangwon Province, South Korea
Namkungia magna (Namkung 1986) – type locality: Balgudeok Cave, Jeongseon County, Gangwon Province, South Korea

References

Grylloblattidae
Insects of Korea
Cave insects